Deathstalker IV: Match of Titans, also called Deathstalker IV: Match of the Titans, is a 1991 American sword and sorcery fantasy film written and directed by Howard R. Cohen. Rick Hill, who played the titular role in the first film, reprises his role in this film. It is the fourth and final installment in the Deathstalker tetralogy.

Plot
It began as a contest of strength - a brazen challenge to lure competitors from far away into the main arena of a Queen's castle.  Among the warriors stands the champion, Deathstalker, who handily defeats all opponents.  Mysteriously, combatants disappear from the castle one by one.  Now, in a blood chilling Match of Titans, Deathstalker must defend his fellow warriors, his life and his newfound love against an invincible army of Stone Warriors and the wicked Queen who rules them as master.

Release
The film was released on VHS in the US by New Horizons Home Video in the early 1990s.  The film was released on DVD by New Concorde in 2002. However it was not re-released by Shout Factory in the Roger Corman's Cult Classics line.

References

External links 
  
 

1991 films
1990s fantasy action films
American sword and sorcery films
Deathstalker (film series)
Films shot in Bulgaria
American fantasy action films
1990s English-language films
1990s American films